Giorgi Chkheidze (born October 30, 1997) is a Georgian male weightlifter, competing in the 105 kg category and representing Georgia at international competitions. Chkheidze participated in the men's 105 kg event at the 2015 World Weightlifting Championships, and at the 2016 Summer Olympics, where he failed to register a single lift in the clean and jerk phase.

Major results

References

External links 
 

1997 births
Living people
Male weightlifters from Georgia (country)
Weightlifters at the 2016 Summer Olympics
Olympic weightlifters of Georgia (country)
Place of birth missing (living people)
21st-century people from Georgia (country)